Donbal Deh (also Romanized as Donbāl Deh; also known as Donbāleh Deh) is a village in Khorgam Rural District, Khorgam District, Rudbar County, Gilan Province, Iran. At the 2006 census, its population was 36, in 10 families.

References 

Populated places in Rudbar County